The Yongning Pagoda or Yongning Temple in Luoyang was one of the tallest buildings of the world from 516 AD to 534 AD. The timber-frame pagoda with a complete column grid and a stabilising masonry-core was built during the Northern Wei in 516 AD, but is no longer extant. Possibly nine stories high, of which seven were made of earth platforms with wooden verandas, and the top two stories being completely out of wood. One source states that it was 90 zhang (about ) high, plus a 10 zhang high pinnacle, which is thought to be an exaggeration. More reliable sources suggest that it may have been 40 zhang (about ) or 49 zhang high, including the pinnacle having possibly had a top height of 137, 147, or with a pinnacle of extra 7 zhang even , making it the tallest building in the world at that time and the tallest pagoda ever built until the completion of the Tianning Temple (Changzhou) in 2007. Pillar bases have been discovered at each corner of the pagoda. The Yongning Pagoda was destroyed in 534 when it was struck by lightning and caught fire.

See also
 List of tallest structures built before the 20th century

References

Former world's tallest buildings
Burned buildings and structures in China
Buddhist architecture in Luoyang
Stupas in Henan